Events from the year 1954 in Ireland.

Incumbents
 President: Seán T. O'Kelly
 Taoiseach:
 Éamon de Valera (FF) (until 2 June 1954)
 John A. Costello (FG) (from 2 June 1954)
 Tánaiste: 
 Seán Lemass (FF) (until 2 June 1954)
 William Norton (Lab) (from 2 June 1954)
 Minister for Finance: 
 Seán MacEntee (FF) (until 2 June 1954)
 Gerard Sweetman (FG) (from 2 June 1954)
 Chief Justice: Conor Maguire
 Dáil: 
 14th (until 23 April 1954)
 15th (from 2 June 1954)
 Seanad: 
 7th (until 7 July 1954)
 8th (from 22 July 1954)

Events
1 January – 1954 was the first Marian year. There were many events and devotions to Our Lady, and shrines and statues were erected in public places.
11 January – The Irish Council of the European Movement was formed in Dublin.
19 January – The government announced that the new Cork Airport will be built at Ballygarvan, four miles south of the city.
19 February – Captain Henry Harrison, the last surviving member of the party led by Charles Stewart Parnell, died aged 87.
20 April – Murderer Michael Manning, aged 25, was executed in Mountjoy Prison. He was the last person to be judicially executed in the state.
5 May – At its headquarters in Kingsbridge, CIÉ signed a £4.75 million contract to replace its steam locomotives with diesels.
16 May – Thirty thousand marched through Dublin in a huge Marian year procession, the city's greatest display of Catholic faith since the International Eucharistic Congress of 1932.
18 May – 1954 Irish general election: Fianna Fáil lost four seats. The second inter-party government under John A. Costello came to power when the members of the 15th Dáil assembled on 2 June.
12 June – An Irish Republican Army (IRA) unit carried out a successful arms raid on Gough Barracks in Armagh, signalling the renewal of IRA activity following a long hiatus.
28 June – Alfie Byrne was elected Lord Mayor of Dublin for the tenth time.
5 July – Dublin Corporation decided that Nelson's Pillar on O'Connell Street in Dublin will not be removed.
5 September – Twenty seven people died when KLM Flight 633 crashed two minutes after leaving Shannon Airport.
8 September – Marian College, Dublin opened for the first time.
Undated
 Entrepreneur Joe "Spud" Murphy (1923–2001) set up Tayto to manufacture crisps.
 The Evening Press newspaper was launched in Dublin.

Arts and literature

 16 June – The first public celebration of Bloomsday took place in Dublin. Writers Flann O'Brien, Patrick Kavanagh and Anthony Cronin travelled in a horse-drawn coach stopping at numerous pubs to retrace the steps of the characters from James Joyce's novel Ulysses.
 16 October – A marble plaque was unveiled at Westland Row, Dublin, to mark the centenary of the birth of Oscar Wilde.
 19 November – Brendan Behan's first play, The Quare Fellow, premièred at the Pike Theatre, Dublin, to great reviews.
 The first Cork International Choral and Folk Dance Festival was held.
 English-born painter Derek Hill settled at St Columb's Rectory, near Churchill, County Donegal.
 Publication of Christy Brown's autobiography My Left Foot.
 Publication of Iris Murdoch's first novel, Under the Net.

Sport

Association football
League of Ireland
Winners: Shamrock Rovers

FAI Cup
Winners: Drumcondra 1–0 St Patrick's Athletic.

Births
3 January – Fintan Cullen, art historian and writer.
10 January – Bairbre de Brún, Sinn Féin MEP and first Sinn Féin politician to represent Northern Ireland in the European Parliament.
22 January – Ger Fennelly, Kilkenny hurler.
26 January – Sean O'Callaghan, Provisional Irish Republican Army member and Garda Síochána informer (died 2017).
8 March – Dermot Keely, soccer player and manager.
12 March – Francis Martin O'Donnell, United Nations official.
6 April – Billy Fitzpatrick, Kilkenny hurler.
11 April – Michael Lyster, RTÉ sports broadcaster.
15 April – Michael Willis, only official IRA member to escape from Crumlin Road prison.
25 April – Róisín Shortall, Labour Party TD for Dublin North-West.
29 April – Gavan O'Herlihy, actor.
30 April – Gerry Daly, soccer player.
5 May – Ger Henderson, Kilkenny hurler.
13 May – Johnny Logan, born Seán Patrick Michael Sherrard, singer and songwriter (born in Australia).
25 May – Daragh O'Malley, actor.
6 June – Tim O'Reilly, computer software promoter.
6 July – Tim Kennelly, Gaelic footballer with Kerry (died 2005).
23 July – Arthur Morgan, Provisional Irish Republican Army prisoner, Sinn Féin TD for Louth.
27 July – Pat Delaney, Offaly hurler.
28 July – Mikey Sheehy, Gaelic footballer (Kerry).
3 August – George Birmingham, Fine Gael politician.
5 August – Paddy Glackin, fiddle player.
12 August – Brian Cody, Kilkenny hurler, manager.
22 August – Jimmy Barry-Murphy, hurler and Gaelic footballer (St. Finbarr's, Cork, Munster).
8 September – Áine Brady, Fianna Fáil TD for Kildare North.
3 October – Mick Holden, Gaelic footballer and hurler (died in 2007).
8 October – Tony Ward, international rugby player and sports journalist.
16 October
Bertie Óg Murphy, Cork hurler and manager.
Noel Slevin, journalist.
2 November – Martin Cullen, Fianna Fáil Teachta Dála representing Waterford and Cabinet Minister.
11 December – Noel Lane, Galway hurler and manager.
17 December – Síle de Valera, Fianna Fáil TD representing Clare, Minister and MEP.
Full date unknown
Catherine Dunne, novelist.
Harry O'Donoghue, musician and songwriter.
Eugene Sheehy, Group Chief Executive of Allied Irish Bank Plc.

Deaths
2 February – Áine Ceannt, revolutionary activist and humanitarian (born 1880).
20 April – Michael Manning, carter, convicted of murder and hanged, last person executed in the Republic of Ireland (born 1929).
1 May – James Macmahon, civil servant and businessman, Under-Secretary for Ireland from 1918 to 1922 (born 1865).
2 May – Elinor Darwin, engraver and portrait painter (born 1871).
20 May – Roger Sweetman, barrister-at-law, member of 1st Dáil representing North Wexford (born 1874).
8 July – George Gardiner, boxer (born 1877).
11 September – R. M. Smyllie, editor of The Irish Times (born 1894 in Scotland).
16 September – James G. Douglas, member of the 1922 Seanad (born 1887).
21 October – T. V. Honan, merchant, Fianna Fáil member of the Seanad (born 1878).

References

 
1950s in Ireland
Ireland
Years of the 20th century in Ireland